David Wolfson, Baron Wolfson of Tredegar  (born 19 July 1968) is a British politician, barrister and life peer. He was Parliamentary Under-Secretary of State for Justice from December 2020 to April 2022, when he resigned from the post after Prime Minister Boris Johnson and others were found to have broken COVID-related laws by attending parties.

Early life and career
Born in Liverpool on 19 July 1968, Wolfson was educated in King David High School, Liverpool, and then spent a year at Yeshivat HaKotel in Jerusalem. He read Oriental studies and law at Selwyn College, Cambridge, graduating with a Bachelor of Arts (BA) degree in 1991. As per tradition, his BA was promoted to a Master of Arts (MA Cantab) degree in 1994. His father was a solicitor who later became a district judge; his mother attended university as a mature student and taught law in further education colleges.

Wolfson later attended the Inns of Court School of Law during when he was awarded an Inns of Court Scholarship. He was called to the bar at Inner Temple, one of the Inns of Court that had given him a Major Scholarship, in October 1992, where he is now a bencher.

Career outside politics
Wolfson practised in commercial law at One Essex Court in Temple, London.

Wolfson was instructed in many of the major banking and commercial disputes in recent years, and his practice extended over a broad range of commercial law, both in litigation and international arbitration. He also sat as an arbitrator in both domestic and international disputes. Wolfson says the high point of his career was convincing the Court of Appeal that a case that he successfully argued at the High Court five years prior was incorrectly decided. 

Prior to joining the UK government, Wolfson was awarded Commercial Litigation Silk of the Year 2020 by The Legal 500, and also Commercial Litigation Silk of the Year in the Chambers UK Bar Awards 2020.

In government
Wolfson was appointed Parliamentary Under-Secretary of State for Justice at the Ministry of Justice on 22 December 2020. He was later created Baron Wolfson of Tredegar, of Tredegar in the County of Gwent, on 30 December 2020, and was introduced to the House of Lords on 7 January 2021.

On 13 April 2022 Wolfson resigned from the government over Partygate after Boris Johnson and Rishi Sunak were fined. Wolfson stated the "scale, context and nature" of Government COVID breaches were "inconsistent with the rule of law". Wolfson claimed it would be wrong for "that conduct to pass with constitutional impunity, especially when many in society complied with the rules at great personal cost, and others were fined or prosecuted for similar, and sometimes apparently more trivial, offences." He maintained he had "no option" except resignation due to his "ministerial and professional obligations" in this field.

Personal life 
Wolfson is a practising Orthodox Jew. He married Louise in 1995, who is a former partner at Allen & Overy and currently runs a legal consultancy and occasionally sits as a tribunal judge. Together they have three children, Sam, Zara, and Abi.

References

|-

1968 births
21st-century English politicians
Alumni of Selwyn College, Cambridge
Conservative Party (UK) life peers
English Jews
Life peers created by Elizabeth II
Living people
Members of the Inner Temple
People educated at King David High School, Liverpool
People from Liverpool
21st-century King's Counsel